Jazz from Hell is an instrumental album whose selections were all composed and recorded by American musician Frank Zappa. It was released on November 15, 1986 by Barking Pumpkin Records on vinyl and cassette, and in 1987 by Rykodisc on CD.

Jazz from Hell was Zappa's final studio album released in his lifetime; for the remaining seven years of his life, he would only release live concert albums, although the posthumous Civilization Phaze III (1994) was completed shortly before his death.

Two music videos were made for the album: "Night School"'s video featured clips from the making of his 1971 film 200 Motels, and "G-Spot Tornado"'s video featured footage Zappa shot in the early 1960s at a county fair.

Background
Frank Zappa explained that the album title was a political reference: "Things in America can be from hell. Right now we have a president from hell (Ronald Reagan), and a National Security Council from hell, so we should add Jazz from Hell also." 1987's Video from Hell, in which the quote is featured, is titled similarly.

All compositions were executed by Frank Zappa on the Synclavier DMS with the exception of "St. Etienne", a guitar solo excerpted from a live performance Zappa gave of "Drowning Witch" from his Ship Arriving Too Late to Save a Drowning Witch album, during a concert in Saint-Étienne, France, on his 1982 tour.

"While You Were Art II" is a Synclavier performance based on a transcription of Zappa's improvised guitar solo on the track "While You Were Out" from the album Shut Up 'n Play Yer Guitar (1981). The unreleased original Synclavier performance was done using only the unit's FM synthesis, while the recording found here was Zappa's "deluxe" arrangement featuring newer samples and timbres.

"Night School" was possibly named for a late-night show that Zappa pitched to ABC; the network did not pick it up.

"G-Spot Tornado", assumed by Zappa to be impossible to play by humans, would be performed by Ensemble Modern on the concert recording The Yellow Shark (1993).

Releases
In the initial European CD release, the album was featured as the second album on a "two for the price of one compilation," with nine tracks from Frank Zappa Meets the Mothers of Prevention (1985) on the same disc.

Awards
Zappa won a 1988 Grammy Award for Best Rock Instrumental Performance for this album.

Controversy
Though Jazz from Hell is an entirely instrumental album, there is an unconfirmed report that the Fred Meyer chain of stores, then based in Portland, Oregon, sold it in their "Music Market" department featuring an RIAA Parental Advisory sticker.

Track listing 
The music to all selections was composed, and all selections were arranged, by Frank Zappa.

Personnel 
 Frank Zappa – lead guitar, Synclavier, keyboards, production

on "St. Etienne"
 Steve Vai – rhythm guitar 
 Ray White – rhythm guitar
 Tommy Mars – keyboards
 Bobby Martin – keyboards
 Scott Thunes – bass guitar
 Chad Wackerman – drums
 Ed Mann – percussion

Technical personnel
 Greg Gorman – cover photo
 Bob Rice – computer assistant
 Bob Stone – engineering

References

External links
 

1986 albums
Albums produced by Frank Zappa
Barking Pumpkin Records albums
Capitol Records albums
Frank Zappa albums
Grammy Award for Best Rock Instrumental Performance
Instrumental albums
Rykodisc albums